Maria Padilla is a melodramma, or opera, in three acts by Gaetano Donizetti. Gaetano Rossi and the composer wrote the Italian libretto after François Ancelot's play. It premiered on 26 December 1841 at La Scala, Milan. The plot is loosely based on the historical figure María de Padilla, the mistress of Pedro the Cruel, King of Castile.

Performance history
The American premiere took place in 1990 when the young Renée Fleming made her major debut with Opera Omaha. Among other performances, the opera was presented by the Buxton Festival in 2003 and by the Minnesota Opera in 2005.

Roles

Synopsis 
Place: Castile
Time: 14th century

Maria tells her sister Ines that she hopes to marry Don Pedro, the ruler of Castile. When he sneaks into her room disguised as Mendez, Maria tells him that she knows his true identity and demands marriage to save her honour. Don Pedro acquiesces, although the marriage must be kept secret. After their elopement, a faction of the Don Pedro's court wants him marry Bianca, a Bourbon princess, in order to avoid a civil war. He appears to be negotiating this, despite his secret marriage to Maria.

Meanwhile, Maria's father, Don Ruiz di Padilla, appears at the court. Believing that she is merely Don Pedro's mistress, he challenges the prince to a duel, but is led away in disgrace. Maria visits her father and tries to explain that she is the secret wife of Don Pedro, but her father refuses to listen.

Much to Maria's horror, Bianca arrives at the court, and is welcomed by Maria's enemies there as Don Pedro's bride and their queen. Instead, Don Pedro proclaims Maria as his queen and she dies of joy. (In the original ending which was changed by the censors, Maria grabbed the crown from Bianca's head and then committed suicide.)

Recordings

References

Further reading
Allitt, John Stewart (1991), Donizetti: In the Light of Romanticism and the Teaching of Johann Simon Mayr, Shaftesbury: Element Books (UK); Rockport, Massachusetts: Element, Inc. (US)
Ashbrook, William (1998), "Donizetti, Gaetano" in Stanley Sadie (ed.), The New Grove Dictionary of Opera, Vol. One. London: Macmillan Publishers, Inc.  
Ashbrook, William and Sarah Hibberd (2001), in Holden, Amanda (ed.), The New Penguin Opera Guide, New York: Penguin Putnam. . pp. 224 – 247.
Black, John (1982), Donizetti's Operas in Naples, 1822–1848. London: The Donizetti Society.
Loewenberg, Alfred (1970). Annals of Opera, 1597–1940, 2nd edition. Rowman and Littlefield
Osborne, Charles, (1994), The Bel Canto Operas of Rossini, Donizetti, and Bellini, Portland, Oregon: Amadeus Press. 
Sadie, Stanley, (ed.); John Tyrell (exec. ed.) (2004), The New Grove Dictionary of Music and Musicians. 2nd edition. London: Macmillan.  (hardcover).   (eBook).
 Weinstock, Herbert (1963), Donizetti and the World of Opera in Italy, Paris, and Vienna in the First Half of the Nineteenth Century, New York: Pantheon Books.

External links
 
  Donizetti Society (London) website
 Libretto (Italian)

Italian-language operas
Operas by Gaetano Donizetti
1841 operas
Operas
Opera world premieres at La Scala
Operas set in Spain
Operas based on plays
Libretti by Gaetano Rossi